Rhagium pygmaeum is a species of beetle in the family Cerambycidae. It was described by Ludwig Ganglbauer in 1881.

References

Lepturinae
Beetles described in 1881